Danilo Petrović (born 24 January 1992) is an inactive Serbian tennis player.

Petrović has a career high ATP singles ranking of world No. 137 achieved on 19 October 2020. He also has a career high doubles ranking of world No. 205 achieved on 28 May 2018. Petrović has won two singles and two doubles titles on the ATP Challenger Tour.

Petrović made his Davis Cup debut playing doubles for Serbia in the 2018 Davis Cup World Group Play-offs vs. India. Partnered with Nikola Milojević, they defeated Rohan Bopanna/Saketh Myneni in straight sets to help secure Serbia a decisive 3–0 lead after second day's play. (Serbia eventually won the tie 4–0)

He won his maiden Challenger title in Jerusalem defeating Filip Peliwo.

His biggest success came at 2020 Forte Village Sardegna Open, only at his second ATP Tour main-draw appearance, where as a lucky loser, he reached the semifinals before losing to former top-20 player and former 2018 French Open semifinalist Marco Cecchinato.

Challenger and Futures finals

Singles: 27 (13 titles, 14 runner–ups)

Doubles: 31 (16 titles, 15 runner–ups)

References

External links
 
 
 

1992 births
Living people
Serbian male tennis players
Tennis players from Belgrade